Ronan Maher (born 30 December 2004) is an Irish professional footballer who plays as a midfielder for  club Walsall.

Club career
Maher played futsal at an early age, and played football at West Bromwich Albion for four years before being released at under-11 level. He then joined Walsall at the age of eleven and was the under-18 team's top-scorer during the 2021–22 campaign. He made his first-team debut on the opening day of the 2022–23 season on 30 July 2022, coming on as an 80th-minute substitute in a 4–0 win over Hartlepool United at the Bescot Stadium. He signed a three-year professional contract the following month.

International career
Maher made his debut for the Republic of Ireland under-19 team in a 6–0 win over Gibraltar on 21 September 2022. He started in the following game, a 2023 UEFA European Under-19 Championship qualification match with Wales, which ended in a 2–0 victory for the Irish. Walsall manager Michael Flynn said that he was "very proud of Ronan".

Career statistics

References

2004 births
Living people
Republic of Ireland association footballers
Republic of Ireland youth international footballers
Association football midfielders
West Bromwich Albion F.C. players
Walsall F.C. players
English Football League players
Republic of Ireland expatriate association footballers
Expatriate footballers in England